Stuart Cheshire is a Distinguished Engineer, Scientist and Technologist (DEST) at Apple. He pioneered Zeroconf networking while employed at Apple. Zeroconf was originally released by Apple as Rendezvous, but later renamed Bonjour. Subsequently, he co-authored the book Zero Configuration Networking: The Definitive Guide, published by O'Reilly, with Daniel H Steinberg.

He is the author or co-author of 27 IETF RFCs principally concerning multicast DNS, and NAT.

He is also the author of Bolo, a networked tank game, originally written for the BBC Micro and later ported to the Apple Macintosh.

Biography

Education
Stuart Cheshire received his B.A. and M.A. degrees from Sidney Sussex College, Cambridge, U.K., in June 1989 and June 1992.  He received his M.Sc. and Ph.D. degrees from Stanford University, Stanford, CA, in June 1996 and April 1998.

While at Stanford, Stuart Cheshire and his colleague Mary Baker designed the Consistent Overhead Byte Stuffing algorithm.

References

External links
Stuart Cheshire's homepage
Cheshire's November 2005 Google Tech Talk: "Zero Configuration Networking with Bonjour"

Year of birth missing (living people)
Living people
People educated at Bishop Vesey's Grammar School
Alumni of Sidney Sussex College, Cambridge
Apple Inc. employees
Free software programmers